The following is a list of current and former commissioned bases used by the Royal Australian Navy.

Current bases

Former bases

Notes

References 

 

 
Bases

fr:Royal Australian Navy#Bases de la marine